Tuilevu is Fijian surname. Notable people with the surname include:

Aisea Tuilevu (born 1972), Fijian rugby union player
Jeremaiya Tuilevu Tamanisau (born 1982), Fijian rugby union player

Fijian-language surnames